Ilungu is an administrative ward in the Mbeya Rural district of the Mbeya Region of Tanzania. In 2016 the Tanzania National Bureau of Statistics report there were 13,330 people in the ward, from 12,095 in 2012.

Villages and hamlets 
The ward has 7 villages, and 52 hamlets.

 Kikondo
 CCM
 Dodoma
 Mjimwema
 Mpakani
 Ndwila
 Pambamoto
 Shango
 Chamasengo
 Ilangali
 Itiwa
 Mjimwema
 Mnyinga
 Shango
 Nyalwela
 Ikuha
 Isanga
 Isyonje A
 Isyonje B
 Itete
 Katumba
 Kumbulu
 Loleza
 Mwanjembe
 Nyalwela
 Ngole
 Igalama
 Mabande
 Muungano
 Mwambanga
 Ngole chini
 Ngole juu
 Nzumba A
 Nzumba B
 Mwela
 Idumbwe
 Isongole
 Kamficheni
 Kilimani
 Kitulo
 Nsengo
 Ifupa
 Ifupa A
 Ifupa B
 Loleza A
 Loleza B
 Loleza kati
 Maendeleo
 Majenje
 Matwitwi
 Ngwenyu
 Voya
 Mashese
 Ileje
 Isanga
 Magombati
 Makunguru
 Mashese kati
 Mji mwema

References

Wards of Mbeya Region